Showman can have a variety of meanings, usually by context and depending on the country.

Australia 
Travelling showmen are people who run amusement and side show equipment at regional shows, state capital shows, events and festivals throughout Australia. In the past, the term has also been used for the people who organized freak shows, sideshows, circuses, travelling theatre troupes and boxing tents.

In Australia, there are around 500 travelling show families, Australian travelling show families in the Eastern states have a travelling School that has approximately 90 children.

Ireland 
Family names associated with funfairs in Ireland include Fox-McFadden,  Cassells, Cullen, McFadden, Murray, Bird, Perks and Bell. Turbetts, Hudsons, McCormacks, McGurk, Wilmots and Grahams are associated with coastal amusements, particularly in the west of the country.

Turkey 
"Showman" ("şovmen" in Turkish) refers to a talk show host in Turkey.

United Kingdom 

In the United Kingdom, showmen are a community intrinsically linked to the businesses they operate, such as funfairs and circuses. The Showmen's Guild of Great Britain is the most dominant trade association, with a membership of around 4,700 and a total collective of 25,000 showmen and -women in the industry.
The head of the family is the  For example, the Guild co-organizes St Giles' Fair in Oxford with Oxford City Council each September, alongside a number of other fairs and events across the UK. A large amount of major events in the UK have a fairground element incorporated, such as the Winter Wonderland in Hyde Park, Leeds Festival and Edinburgh's Festive offering, to name a few.

Whilst the Showmen's Guild of Great Britain (SGGB) stands as the largest trade association, there are other, smaller industry bodies such as the Association of Independent Showmen (AIS) and Society of Independent Roundabout Proprietors (SIRPS).

United States 
Those of the traveling circus (traveling carnival)—Carnies are comparable to Showmen but in the United States, the term "Showman" primarily refers to male dancers (showgirls being the female equivalent); an example being Gene Kelly in the film Singin' in the Rain. 

The term showman or show people, can also be meant as a superlative or complimentary term, sometimes as an accolade or quasi-title, such as in the documentary name Harry Saltzman: Showman.

See also 
 Carny

References 

19th-century establishments in the United Kingdom
Entertainment occupations
Fairs